Kip Warren Colvey II (born 15 March 1994) is a New Zealand former professional footballer. He last played for Colorado Rapids in Major League Soccer.

Early life
Colvey was born in Hawaii, but grew up in the Marlborough Sounds in New Zealand. He was educated at Nelson College and played senior football for the Nelson Suburbs club, before moving to Christchurch where he attended the Asia–Pacific Football Academy.

Career

College and amateur
Colvey spent all four years of his college career at California Polytechnic State University between 2012 and 2015. Colvey also spent the 2013 and 2014 seasons with the Ventura County Fusion of the Premier Development League. In 2013, he scored one goal in twelve league matches while scoring two goals in twelve appearances in 2014.

Professional
On 19 January 2016, Colvey was drafted 49th overall in the 2016 MLS SuperDraft by San Jose Earthquakes. Kip got his first start of the season on 13 March 2016 against the Portland Timbers and played the full 90 minutes. He signed with the club on 4 March 2016 and earned honors as SBI MLS Rookie of the Week on 14 March 2016.

On 2 April 2017, he played the first match for Reno 1868 FC.

Colvey was released by San Jose on 27 November 2017. Two weeks later he was selected by the Colorado Rapids in the league's 2017 waiver draft, reuniting him with Anthony Hudson, his former international manager.

In July 2018, Colvey was loaned to Colorado Springs Switchbacks FC.

Following his release by Colorado at the end of their 2018 season, Colvey announced his decision to retire from playing professional football, choosing to pursue a career as a physician assistant for better financial security and long-term stability.

International
On 12 May 2016 he was named in the 23-man squad for the All Whites for the 2016 OFC Nations Cup. Colvey made his debut for the senior New Zealand national football team in a 2016 OFC Nations Cup 3–1 win over Fiji.

References

External links

Cal Poly profile

1994 births
Living people
New Zealand association footballers
Cal Poly Mustangs men's soccer players
Colorado Rapids players
Colorado Springs Switchbacks FC players
Major League Soccer players
New Zealand international footballers
People educated at Nelson College
Reno 1868 FC players
Sacramento Republic FC players
San Jose Earthquakes draft picks
San Jose Earthquakes players
Soccer players from Hawaii
USL League Two players
USL Championship players
Ventura County Fusion players
2016 OFC Nations Cup players
2017 FIFA Confederations Cup players
New Zealand expatriate association footballers
Association football defenders